Kleinia odora is found in Ethiopia, Somalia, Yemen and Saudi Arabia.  It is distinguished by having succulent stems or leaves.  It is common in low dry hills along coastal plains.  It forms large clumps bearing dense clusters of cream or whitish flowers on the tips of the pencil-like stems.

Description
The stems of the plant are terete, jointed, and are marked with dark lines that run from the bases of the leaves. The inflorescences are terminal corymbs and the flowers are a pale yellow.

Uses
Kleinia odora and other triterpenoids contain many properties that allow them to be particularly useful in biological and pharmacological activities. Those properties are used to aid in such activities that are antitumour, anti-viral, anti-inflammatory, antimicrobial, anti-diabetic, and anti-protozoal.

References

odora